Afroqueta is a genus of flowering plants belonging to Turneroideae (Passifloraceae). It is a monotypic group, consisting of Afroqueta capensis  Afroqueta capensis was originally designated as Piriqueta capensis, phylogenetic analysis of Turneroideae suggested A. capensis was closer related to other African members of the subfamily. It is a perennial subshrub native to the tropical southern regions of Zimbabwe to KwaZulu-Natal. Its flowers are described as heterostylous and yellow.

References

Passifloraceae
Malpighiales genera